Most of Coheed and Cambria's albums are part of a sci-fi saga called The Amory Wars. They have been released out of sequence in relation to the story arc. The first album released was The Second Stage Turbine Blade, the second part in the series, followed by the third, In Keeping Secrets of Silent Earth: 3, and the fourth, which is split into two volumes. The first, Good Apollo, I'm Burning Star IV, Volume One: From Fear Through the Eyes of Madness, was released in 2005, and the second, entitled Good Apollo, I'm Burning Star IV, Volume Two: No World for Tomorrow, was released on October 23, 2007, and is said to be the last chapter in the ongoing saga of Coheed and Cambria Kilgannon, the main characters in The Amory Wars saga. They released the prequel to the saga, Year of the Black Rainbow, on April 13, 2010. The band then released a double album entitled The Afterman, set before the events of Year of the Black Rainbow. The first part, The Afterman: Ascension, was released October 9, 2012, and the second part, The Afterman: Descension, was released February 5, 2013. The band's eighth album, The Color Before the Sun, was released on October 16, 2015. It is the band's first album not to be part of The Amory Wars concept. The band's ninth album, Vaxis – Act I: The Unheavenly Creatures, returned to The Amory Wars story. It was released on October 5, 2018. The band's newest studio album, Vaxis – Act II: A Window of the Waking Mind, was released on June 24, 2022.

Albums

Studio albums

Live albums

EPs

Notes

A.  These EPs were released under Coheed and Cambria's original name, Shabűtie.

Singles

Notes

B. "The Suffering" did not peak on the US Billboard Hot 100 chart, but did peak at number 10 on the Bubbling Under Hot 100 chart, which acts as a 25 song extension of the Hot 100.

Videos

Video albums

Music videos

References

Discographies of American artists
Rock music group discographies